The Coast Guard is a 2002 South Korean film directed by Kim Ki-duk. The film deals with military atrocities and the absurdities of borders and conflicts.

Plot
Private Kang is a South Korean marine guarding the South Korean coastline near the Korean Demilitarized Zone, overly eager to shoot a North Korean spy during his time on duty. On one dimly-lit night, a drunk local couple sneaks into the fenced-off demilitarized zone to have sex. Kang spots the man on his blurry night-vision scope, and mistaking him for a North Korean spy, kills him with his rifle and grenade.

Kang and the girlfriend of the dead civilian both have mental breakdowns.

The woman believes the members of the coastal guards are her dead lover, and engages in sexual affairs with them. She eventually becomes pregnant and is forced into a botched abortion by the unit's incompetent medics. The woman's brother, enraged, attempts to stab members of the unit but is subdued and arrested by local police.

Kang is commended for his action and is granted leave as a reward, during which he shows signs of post-traumatic stress disorder. His friends consequently ostracize him and his girlfriend leaves him. Upon return to his post, he is cornered and beaten by the dead civilian's friends, and his PTSD worsens. After several episodes, the military deems Kang mentally unfit for service and honorably discharges him. Kang refuses to leave, and after several failed attempts to return to service, resorts to stealing military equipment and killing members of his unit.

He then goes to Myeongdong in Seoul, where he stabs people at random with his bayonet before being confronted by armed policemen. Gunfire then erupts.

Cast
Jang Dong-gun as Private Kang
Kim Jung-hak as Private Kim
Park Ji-a as Mi-young
Yoo Hae-jin as Cheol-gu
Jeong Jin as So Cho-jang
Kim Ku-taek as Sergeant Jang
Kim Kang-woo as Private Jo
Park Yoon-jae as Private Yoon
Kim Tae-woo as Private Seo
Kim Young-jae as medic
Kim Mi-sung as tourist woman #1
In-seong as agent 2
 as man stabbed with bayonet
Won Deok-hyun as kid
Shim Hoon-ki as coast guard 2
Jung Hee-tae as agent 7
Jeon Sung-ae as Young-kil's mother
Park Sung-il as Private Kang's friend
Choi Min as provost

Production
Filming took place around Jeonju and Seoul, South Korea from June 18, 2002 to July 19, 2002. The actors playing the marines went through a mini-boot camp to help them get into the roles of South Korean marines, the director himself a veteran of the South Korean marine corps. One day of filming was interrupted due to the participants' viewing of the 2002 FIFA World Cup quarterfinals between South Korea and Spain.

Awards

Wins
38th Karlovy Vary International Film Festival 2003:
 FIPRESCI International Critics Award: "For the strong and innovative depiction of the illusion of power which destroys humanity on both sides of the fence."
 NETPAC Award
 Town of Karlovy Vary Award

Nominations
38th Karlovy Vary International Film Festival 2003:
 Crystal Globe

Notes

External links
 
 
 
 

2002 films
2000s action drama films
Films directed by Kim Ki-duk
South Korean independent films
2000s Korean-language films
Films about the Republic of Korea Marine Corps
South Korean action drama films
2002 drama films
Films about post-traumatic stress disorder
Films set in 2002
2000s South Korean films